Aleksandar Kahvić (born 2 January 2004) is a Bosnian footballer currently playing as a forward for Maccabi Haifa, on loan from Red Star Belgrade.

Club career
Born in Doboj, Bosnia and Herzegovina, Kahvić started his career with Serbian side Sporting AF Teslić, before moving to Internacional Beograd, where he notably scored 24 goals in 16 games before being picked up by Serbian giants Red Star Belgrade and immediately loaned to affiliate Grafičar.

In October 2021 he was named by English newspaper The Guardian as one of the best players born in 2004 worldwide.

After being linked with moves to Russia and Slovenia, Kahvić joined Israeli side Maccabi Haifa on loan with an option to buy in September 2022.

International career
Kahvić has represented Bosnia and Herzegovina at under-19 and under-21 level.

Style of play
Standing at 1.92 m, Kahvić is known for his prolific goalscoring ability, and models his style of play on Belgian striker Romelu Lukaku.

References

2004 births
Living people
Bosnia and Herzegovina people of Serbian descent
People from Doboj
Bosnia and Herzegovina footballers
Bosnia and Herzegovina youth international footballers
Association football forwards
Red Star Belgrade footballers
RFK Grafičar Beograd players
Maccabi Haifa F.C. players
Bosnia and Herzegovina expatriate footballers
Bosnia and Herzegovina expatriate sportspeople in Israel
Expatriate footballers in Israel